Parry Sound is a sound or bay of Georgian Bay on Lake Huron, in Ontario, Canada. It is highly irregularly shaped with many deep bays and islands. Killbear Provincial Park is located on the large peninsula that separates the sound from Georgian Bay, while it is bordered on the south side by Parry Island, home of the Wasauksing First Nation, Wasauksing being the First Nation's name for the bay. At the head of the sound is the namesake town that is the largest community on the shores of Georgian Bay from Severn Sound to Manitoulin Island.

The following entities are named after this geographic feature:
 Parry Sound District
 Parry Sound, town and seat of Parry Sound District
 Parry Sound, Unorganized, Centre Part, Ontario
 Parry Sound, Unorganized, North East Part, Ontario
 Electoral districts
 Parry Sound (electoral district), the federal electoral district from 1904 to 1949
 Parry Sound—Muskoka, the current federal electoral district
 Parry Sound—Muskoka (provincial electoral district), the current provincial electoral district

References

Other map sources:

External links

Bays of Ontario
Landforms of Parry Sound District
Bays of Lake Huron
Sounds of Canada
Georgian Bay